In geometry, an isophote is a curve on an illuminated surface that connects points of equal brightness. One supposes that the illumination is done by parallel light and the brightness  is measured by the following scalar product:

where  is the unit normal vector of the surface at point  and  the unit vector of the light's direction. If , i.e. the light is perpendicular to the surface normal, then point  is a point of the surface silhouette observed in direction  Brightness 1 means that the light vector is perpendicular to the surface. A plane has no isophotes, because every point has the same brightness.

In astronomy, an isophote is a curve on a photo connecting points of equal brightness.

Application and example 
In computer-aided design, isophotes are used for checking optically the smoothness of surface connections. For a surface (implicit or parametric), which is differentiable enough, the normal vector depends on the first derivatives. Hence, the differentiability of the isophotes and their geometric continuity is 1 less than that of the surface. If at a surface point only the tangent planes are continuous (i.e. G1-continuous), the isophotes have there a kink (i.e. is only G0-continuous).

In the following example (s. diagram), two intersecting Bezier surfaces are blended by a third surface patch. For the left picture, the blending surface has only G1-contact to the Bezier surfaces and for the right picture the surfaces have G2-contact. This difference can not be recognized from the picture. But the geometric continuity of the isophotes show: on the left side, they have kinks (i.e. G0-continuity), and on the right side, they are smooth (i.e. G1-continuity).

Determining points of an isophote

on an implicit surface 
For an implicit surface with equation  the isophote condition is

That means: points of an isophote with given parameter  are solutions of the non linear system 

which can be considered as the intersection curve of two implicit surfaces. Using the tracing algorithm of Bajaj et al. (see references) one can calculate a polygon of points.

on a parametric surface 
In case of a parametric surface  the isophote condition is

which is equivalent to

This equation describes an implicit curve in the s-t-plane, which can be traced by a suitable algorithm (see. implicit curve) and transformed by  into surface points.

See also 
 Contour line

References 
J. Hoschek, D. Lasser: Grundlagen der geometrischen Datenverarbeitung, Teubner-Verlag, Stuttgart, 1989, p. 31.
Z. Sun, S. Shan, H. Sang et al.: Biometric Recognition, Springer, 2014, p. 158.
C.L. Bajaj, C.M. Hoffmann, R.E. Lynch, J.E.H. Hopcroft: Tracing Surface Intersections, (1988) Comp. Aided Geom. Design 5, pp. 285–307.
C. T. Leondes: Computer Aided and Integrated Manufacturing Systems: Optimization methods, Vol. 3, World Scientific, 2003, p. 209.

External links 
Patrikalakis-Maekawa-Cho: Isophotes (engl.)
A. Diatta, P. Giblin: Geometry of Isophote Curves
Jin Kim: Computing Isophotes of Surface of Revolution and Canal Surface

Curves